Huma Javeed (born: 6 May 1993) is a badminton player from Pakistan.

Career

National 
Javeed represents WAPDA in domestic competitions including National Championships and National Games.

2020

At the 57th National Badminton Championship held in Lahore, Pakistan, Javeed competed with Sehra Akram in the women's doubles where they were beaten by Mahoor Shahzad (Wapda) and Palwasha Bashir (NBP)  in 2 sets (21-9 and 21-8).

International 
Javeed was part of the six member women's team which competed at the 2019 South Asian Games held in Kathmandu, Nepal.

References

Living people
1993 births
Pakistani female badminton players
South Asian Games bronze medalists for Pakistan
South Asian Games medalists in badminton